Rosy Keyser (born 1974 in Baltimore, Maryland, United States) is an American contemporary painter, known for working in large-scale gestural, tactile abstraction. Frequently incorporating found detritus in her work such as beer cans, tarp, and sawdust, Keyser’s work investigates painting and sculpture in a bodily, aggressive way.

She lives and works in Brooklyn and Medusa, New York.

Education
Keyser received her BFA from the Cornell University and received her MFA from the Art Institute of Chicago.

Work
She is represented by CFA Berlin and Maccarone Gallery in New York.

Exhibitions
Keyser has exhibited at institutions including Walker Art Center, Minneapolis, Minnesota;, The Zabludowicz Collection, London;, Louisiana Museum of Modern Art, Humlebaek, Denmark;, and Ballroom Marfa, Texas

Select solo exhibitions
 2016: Lora Reynolds Gallery, Austin, TX (forthcoming)
 2015: We Sing Sin, Contemporary Fine Arts, Berlin, Germany
 2015: Lap of the High Plains, Freddy, Baltimore, MD
 2015: The Hell Bitch, Maccarone, New York, NY
 2014: My Heads Are My Hands, Karma, New York, NY
 2013: Medusa Pie Country, Peter Blum Gallery, New York, NY
 2011: Promethean Dub, Peter Blum Chelsea, New York, NY
 2009: The Moon Ate Me, Peter Blum Chelsea, New York, NY
 2008: Rivers Burn and Run Backward, Peter Blum Chelsea, New York, NY

Select group exhibitions
 2017: Witches, September Gallery, Hudson, NY
 2015: Object Painting- Painting Object, Johathan Viner Gallery, London, United Kingdom
 2015: Community of Influence, Vermont Studio Center Alumni show at Spencer Brownstone Gallery, New York, NY
 2014: Maximalism, Contemporary Fine Arts, Berlin, Germany
 2014: White Columns Benefit Auction and Exhibition, White Columns, New York, NY
 2014: New York Women, G Gallery, Houston, TX
 2014: The Space Where I am, Blain Southern, London, United Kingdom
 2013: The New Sincerity, Lora Reynolds Gallery, Austin, TX
 2013: Painter Painter, curated by Eric Crosby and Bartholomew Ryan, The Walker Art Center, Minneapolis, MN
 2013: Painting from the Zabludowicz Collection: Part II, The Zabludowicz Collection, London, United Kingdom
 2012: Hue and Cry, Sotheby’s S2 Gallery, New York, NY
 2012: Heat Waves, Peter Blum Chelsea, New York, NY
 2012: Pink Caviar, Louisiana Museum of Modern Art, Humlebaek, Denmark
 2012: Science on the Back End, Hauser and Wirth, New York, NY
 2012: Luis Camnitzer, Rosy Keyser, Robert Kinmot, and Linda Matalon, Simone Subal Gallery, New York, NY
 2011: Idealizing the Imaginary: Illusion and Invention in Contemporary Painting, Oakland University Art Gallery, Rochester, MI
 2011: Miriam Bohm, Rosy Keyser, Erin Shirreff, Lisa Cooley, New York, NY
 2011: A Painting Show, Harris Lieberman, New York, NY
 2010: I Can’t Forget, But I Don’t Remember What, Freymond Guth Fine Art, Basel, Switzerland
 2010: Black and White, Jason McCoy Gallery, New York, NY
 2010: Spray, D’Amelio Terras, New York, NY
 2010: Immaterial, Ballroom Marfa, Marfa, TX
 2010: Reflection, Peter Blum Soho, New York, NY
 2009: Almost, Nicelle Beauchene Gallery, New York, NY
 2009: New Work, Reynolds Gallery, Richmond, VA
 2009: Hi, Low and In Between, Grimm Fine Art, Amsterdam, The Netherlands
 2008: Sack of Bones, Peres Project, Los Angeles, CA
 2008: Zero Zone, Tracy Williams Ltd., New York, NY
 2007: Stubborn Materials, Peter Blum Chelsea, New York, NY
 2006: Durer Reenactment, Laeso, Denmark/Baltimore, MD
 2005: Family Portraits and Energetic Blueprints, Rensselaerville, New York, NY
 2005: 7-Year Installation, Track House (Remote Back Side), Marble, CO
 2004: The Stray Show, Track House, Chicago, IL
 2004: On A Wave, Jessica Murray Projects, Brooklyn, NY
 2004: Yard Sale, Track House, Chicago, IL
 2003: Sulcata Solves, Track House, Chicago, IL
 2003: Depiction, Gallery 400 at The University of Illinois at Chicago, Chicago, IL
 2003: The Impotent Landscape, The Pond, Chicago, IL

Collections 

The Louisiana Museum of Modern Art, Humlebæk, Denmark 

The Maxine and Stuart Frankel Foundation, Bloomfield Hills, MI

The Portland Museum of Art, Portland, OR

Walker Art Center, Minneapolis, MN 

The Zabludowicz Collection, London, United Kingdom

Press 
Review by Louisa Elderton, Flash Art, January - February 2016 
Review, Artnews, Summer 2015
Review by Roberta Smith, The New York Times, May 2015
Review, Art in America, May 2015
Review by Anneliese Cooper, Blouin Artinfo, May 2015
Profile by Barbara A. MacAdam, ARTnews, March 2014

References

External links 
Artist's web site
CV PDF

1970 births
20th-century American painters
21st-century American painters
Living people
Cornell University alumni
American women painters
20th-century American women artists
21st-century American women artists